Gérard Ben Arous  (born 26 June 1957) is a French mathematician, specializing in stochastic analysis and its applications to mathematical physics. He served as the director of the Courant Institute of Mathematical Sciences at New York University from 2011 to 2016.

Education and career
Ben Arous studied at École normale supérieure (ENS) from 1977 to 1981. In 1979, Ben Arous received a master's degree in statistics from the University of Paris-Sud. In 1980 he received a Master of Science degree from the University of Paris VI, and in 1981 earned a Ph.D. from the University of Paris VII under Robert Azencott. In the academic year 1982–1983 he was a postdoc at the University of Colorado under the direction of Daniel Stroock. In 1987, Ben Arous earned his habilitation (These d'Etat) and became a maître de conférences at ENS.

In 1988, Ben Arous became a professor at the University of Paris-Sud where he served as the chair of the mathematics department from 1992 to 1994. From 1994 to 1997 he was a professor at ENS and the chair of the mathematics and computer science departments. From 1997 to 2007, Ben Arous was a professor of applied probability theory at the École Polytechnique Fédérale de Lausanne, where he held the chair of Stochastic Modeling and founded the Bernoulli Institute in 2001. Since 2002 he has been a professor at the Courant Institute of Mathematical Sciences of New York University.  In 2009, Ben Arous served as acting Director of the Courant Institute and was director from 2011 to 2016.  He was appointed as the Vice-Provost for Science and Engineering Development at New York University in 2011.

 
In 1993, Ben Arous received the Rollo Davidson Prize. In 1996 he gave a plenary lecture Large deviations as a common probabilistic tool for some problems of analysis, geometry and physics at the European Congress of Mathematicians in Budapest. In 2002 he was an invited speaker at the International Congress of Mathematicians (ICM) in Beijing and gave a talk Aging and Spin Glass Dynamics.

He was an editor for the Journal of the European Mathematical Society. He is an editor for Communications on Pure and Applied Mathematics and, since 2010, the managing editor (with Amir Dembo, Stanford) of Probability Theory and Related Fields. In 2015 he was elected a member of the American Academy of Arts and Sciences. He is a Fellow of the Institute of Mathematical Statistics (August 2011) and an elected member of the International Statistics Institute. He was a member of Bourbaki. His doctoral students include Antonio Auffinger, Raphaël Cerf, Ivan Corwin, Alice Guionnet and Sandrine Péché.

Selected publications

References

External links
 Website at Courant

1957 births
Living people
Nicolas Bourbaki
20th-century French mathematicians
21st-century French mathematicians
École Normale Supérieure alumni
University of Paris alumni
Academic staff of the École Normale Supérieure
Academic staff of the University of Paris
Courant Institute of Mathematical Sciences faculty
Probability theorists
Fellows of the Institute of Mathematical Statistics
Fellows of the American Academy of Arts and Sciences
Probability Theory and Related Fields editors